Shawn Kealoha Boskie (born March 28, 1967), is an American former professional baseball pitcher, who played in Major League Baseball (MLB) from  to . He was drafted by the Chicago Cubs in the first round, 10th overall, in the 1986 Major League Baseball Draft.

Early life

Boskie attended Reno High School in Reno, Nevada, where he played football and baseball. Both his parents were active bowlers and softball players throughout his childhood. His father, Dietrich Boskie, is of Hawaiian descent and grew up in Hilo, Hawaii. He has been active in the Elks Club where he served as a leader locally, statewide, and nationally. His mother, Cheryl Boskie, has been a member of P.E.O. for 50 years. Boskie played college baseball at Modesto Junior College in Modesto, California.

Professional career
Boskie made his major league debut on May 20, 1990, versus the Houston Astros, pitching a 5-hit complete game, while collecting two hits himself. Overall, his rookie year was quite promising, highlighted by a 3.63 earned run average (ERA), in 15 games started. He tied for the league lead in home runs allowed (40), which ranks 12th-most all-time in a single MLB season. Boskie's eight-year big league career also included stints with the Philadelphia Phillies, Seattle Mariners, Baltimore Orioles, and Montreal Expos.

On September 6, 1995, Boskie was the starting pitcher when the Angels played the Orioles on the evening that Cal Ripken Jr. broke Lou Gehrig's consecutive games played streak of 2,130.  Ripken hit a home run off Boskie in the 4th inning (Ripken's third game in a row in which he hit a home run).

Personal life

Boskie is a devout Christian. He worked with the non-profit legal advocacy organization Alliance Defending Freedom for 10 years before joining Pure Flix Entertainment as Vice President of Investor Relations. He married Pamela Russell in 1990 and they reside in Scottsdale, AZ with three children.

References

External links

1967 births
Living people
American expatriate baseball players in Canada
Baltimore Orioles players
Baseball players from Nevada
California Angels players
Chicago Cubs players
Edmonton Trappers players
Major League Baseball pitchers
Modesto Pirates baseball players
Montreal Expos players
People from Hawthorne, Nevada
Philadelphia Phillies players
Reno High School alumni
Seattle Mariners players
Wytheville Cubs players
Peoria Chiefs players
Winston-Salem Spirits players
Charlotte Knights players
Iowa Cubs players
Vancouver Canadians players
Lake Elsinore Storm players
Albuquerque Dukes players
Tucson Sidewinders players
Erie SeaWolves players